The 1979 Dino Ferrari Grand Prix was a non-championship Formula One motor race held at the Autodromo Dino Ferrari, Imola on 16 September 1979.

The event was held in order for the Imola circuit to qualify for World Championship status from the  season onwards, as part of plans to share the Italian Grand Prix with Monza in alternate years.

Sixteen cars entered the race; the eventual winner was Niki Lauda, driving a Brabham-Alfa Romeo. Carlos Reutemann was second in a Lotus-Ford, while Jody Scheckter, who had won the Drivers' Championship at Monza the previous week, was third in his Ferrari. This was the last F1 race in which Brabham used Alfa Romeo engines, and Lauda's last race with the team before he quit the sport during practice for the Canadian Grand Prix two weeks later.

Classification

Qualifying

Race

References

External links

1979 Formula One races
Dino